The Ambassador of the United Kingdom to Chile is the United Kingdom's foremost diplomatic representative in the Republic of Chile, and head of the UK's diplomatic mission in Chile.  The official title is His Britannic Majesty's Ambassador to Chile.

List of heads of mission

Consul-General and Plenipotentiary
1823–1837: Christopher Richard Nugent, Consul General
1837–1841: Colonel John Walpole

Chargé d'Affaires and Consul-General
1841–1849: Colonel John Walpole
1849–1852: Stephen Henry Sulivan
1853–1858: Edward Harris
1858–1872: William Taylour Thomson

Minister Resident and Consul-General to the Republic of Chile
1872–1878: Sir Horace Rumbold
1878–1885: Francis Pakenham
1885–1888: Hugh Fraser
1888–1897: John Kennedy
1897–1901: Audley Gosling

Envoy Extraordinary and Minister Plenipotentiary to the Republic of Chile
1901–1905: Gerard Lowther
1905–1907: Arthur Raikes
1907:          Sir Brooke Boothby, Bt (appointed but did not take up post due to poor health)
1907–1909: Henry Bax-Ironside
1909–1913: Henry Lowther
1913–1918: Sir Francis Stronge
1918–1922: Tudor Vaughan
1923–1924: Sir Arthur Grant Duff
1924–1927: Sir Thomas Hohler
1928–1930: Archibald Clark Kerr

Ambassador Extraordinary and Plenipotentiary to the Republic of Chile
1930–1933: Sir Henry Chilton
1933–1936: Sir Robert Michell
1936:          Sir Joseph Addison (appointed but did not proceed due to ill health)
1937–1940: Sir Charles Bentinck
1940–1945: Sir Charles Orde
1945–1949: Sir John Leche
1949–1951: Sir Bertrand Jerram
1951–1954: Charles Stirling
1955–1958: Sir Charles Empson
1958–1961: Ivor Pink
1961–1966: Sir David Scott Fox
1966–1970: Sir Frederick Mason
1970–1973: Sir David Hildyard
1973–1976: Reginald Secondé
1976–1980: (Ambassador withdrawn after torture of Sheila Cassidy)
1980–1982: John Heath
1982–1987: John Hickman
1987–1990: Alan White
1990–1993: Richard Neilson
1993–1997: Frank Wheeler
1997–2000: Glynne Evans
2000–2003: Gregory Faulkner
2003–2005: Richard Wilkinson
2005–2009: Howard Drake
2009–2014: Jon Benjamin
2014–2018: Fiona Clouder
2018–2021 Jamie Bowden

2021–: Louise De Sousa

References

External links
UK and Chile, gov.uk

Chile
 
United Kingdom